The Northern Taurach, also called the Pongau Taurach, is a river of the state Salzburg in Austria.

The Northern Taurach is a right-hand tributary of the Enns near Radstadt. It is one of the two rivers named Taurach, both of which rise near the Radstädter Tauern Pass, but drain in opposite directions – the other is called . The two valleys, which descend from the Tauern Pass, are also both called Taurach Valley. Together they link the Enns valley to the Mur valley in north–south direction.

References

External links 
 

Rivers of Salzburg (state)
Rivers of Austria